The 2016–17 UMass Minutewomen basketball team represented the University of Massachusetts Amherst during the 2016–17 college basketball season. The Minutewomen, led by first year head coach Tory Verdi, are members of the Atlantic 10 Conference and played their home games at the William D. Mullins Memorial Center. They finished the season 9–21, 3–14 in A-10 play to finish in 13th place. They lost in the first round of the A-10 women's tournament to Saint Louis.

2016–17 media
All non-televised Minutewomen home games and conference road games will stream on the A-10 Digital Network. WMUA will carry Minutewomen games with Mike Knittle on the call.

Roster

Schedule

|-
!colspan=9 style="background:#881c1c; color:#FFFFFF;"| Exbitition

|-
!colspan=9 style="background:#881c1c; color:#FFFFFF;"| Regular season

|-
!colspan=9 style="background:#881c1c; color:#FFFFFF;"| Atlantic 10 Women's Tournament

Rankings
2016–17 NCAA Division I women's basketball rankings

See also
 2016–17 UMass Minutemen basketball team

References

UMass Minutewomen basketball seasons
UMass